Kaishu Hirano (born 14 October 2002) is a Japanese snowboarder who competed at the 2022 Winter Olympics.

Career
Hirano competed at the 2018 FIS Snowboarding Junior World Championships and won a bronze medal in the halfpipe event.

He represented Japan at the 2020 Winter Youth Olympics and won a silver medal in the halfpipe event.

He competed at the 2022 Winter X Games in Aspen, Colorado and won a bronze medal in the superpipe event. 

He represented Japan at the 2022 Winter Olympics in the men's halfpipe event.  He broke the world record for height on a superpipe trick.

Personal life
Kaishu's brother, Ayumu Hirano, is also a snowboarder.

References

2002 births
Living people
Japanese male snowboarders
Olympic snowboarders of Japan
Snowboarders at the 2020 Winter Youth Olympics
Snowboarders at the 2022 Winter Olympics
21st-century Japanese people
X Games athletes